Maciej Wawrzyniec Szczęsny (pronounced ) (born 28 June 1965) is a former footballer from Poland, who played for Legia Warsaw, Widzew Łódź, Polonia Warsaw and Wisła Kraków as a goalkeeper. He participated in the UEFA Champions League with Legia Warsaw (1995–96 - reaching a quarterfinal) and Widzew Łódź (1996–97). He is the only player to have won a Polish championship with four clubs (in 1994 and 1995 with Legia, in 1997 with Widzew, in 2000 with Polonia and in 2001 with Wisła).
Szczęsny played seven times for the Poland national football team, though six of those appearances came in friendlies.

He is now a football commentator. His two sons play football as goalkeepers: Jan (born 1987) for PKS Radość Warsaw in the 6th tier of Polish football, and Wojciech (born 1990) for Italian side Juventus, in Serie A.

References

1965 births
Living people
Polish footballers
Poland international footballers
Legia Warsaw players
Polonia Warsaw players
Widzew Łódź players
Wisła Kraków players
Association football goalkeepers
Footballers from Warsaw
Gwardia Warsaw players